David Butler (born September 14, 1957) is an American wrestler. He competed in the men's Greco-Roman 74 kg at the 1988 Summer Olympics.

References

1957 births
Living people
American male sport wrestlers
Olympic wrestlers of the United States
Wrestlers at the 1988 Summer Olympics
Sportspeople from Muncie, Indiana
Pan American Games medalists in wrestling
Pan American Games gold medalists for the United States
Pan American Games silver medalists for the United States
Wrestlers at the 1987 Pan American Games
Wrestlers at the 1991 Pan American Games
Medalists at the 1991 Pan American Games
20th-century American people